East Danish refers to dialects of the Danish language spoken in Bornholm (Bornholmsk dialect) in Denmark and in Blekinge, Halland, Skåne (Scanian dialect) and the southern parts of Småland in Sweden. After Scania, Halland and Blekinge came to Sweden in the 17th century, the dialects are under Swedish influence. Most residents now speak regionally influenced Standard Swedish. The original dialects are still considered to be part of the East Danish dialect group by many researchers, so they can be considered AS both East Danish and South Swedish dialects.

References

Danish dialects
Languages of Denmark
Languages of Sweden